Eamonn Maloney (born 1953) is a former Irish Independent politician. He was elected to Dáil Éireann as a Labour Party Teachta Dála (TD) for the Dublin South-West constituency at the 2011 general election.

He was a member of South Dublin County Council from 1999 to 2011, representing the Tallaght area. He a former member of Jim Kemmy's Democratic Socialist Party and contested Dublin South-West at the 1987 general election for that party. He is a brother of former Senator Seán Maloney.

In the past he has worked in a factory and been on the dole. During the 31st Dáil, he was the only TD in Ireland who claimed no expenses, a policy he carried out throughout his twelve years at local level and maintained at national level.

Justifying the cut in unemployment benefit from €144 to €100 per week for young people aged 22 to 24 in the 2014 budget, Maloney said "Parents will tell you that they do not want their children at home watching a flat-screen television seven days a week.".

In July 2015, he announced that he would not be contesting the 2016 general election. In September 2015, he resigned from the Labour Party, and announced that he was contesting the 2016 general election as an independent candidate.

He subsequently lost his seat at the 2016 general election, polling 1,627 first preferences.

References

1953 births
Living people
Democratic Socialist Party (Ireland) politicians
Independent TDs
Labour Party (Ireland) TDs
Local councillors in South Dublin (county)
Members of the 31st Dáil
Politicians from County Donegal